Emmanuel James Nuquay is a Liberian politician. He currently serves as a senator from Margibi County.

Biography
Nuquay began serving in the Liberian House of Representatives in 2006, where he represented the 5th Margibi County district. Prior to this, Nuquay was an economist. By 2012, Nuquay served as the chair of the Ways, Means and Finance Committee, as well as a member of the following committees: Judiciary, Agriculture, Forestry and Fisheries, Human and Civil Rights, and Joint Legislative Modernization. In 2014, Nuquay became a founding member of the People's Unification Party (PUP). From October 2016 to 15 January 2018 Nuquay served as speaker of the House of Representatives of Liberia. 

Nuquay's term in the House expired in 2018. Instead of seeking re-election in 2017, Nuquay served as the running mate for Vice President Joseph Boakai, who was running in the 2017 presidential election as the Unity Party nominee. Boakai was defeated by Coalition for Democratic Change nominee George Weah. In 2018, President Weah appointed Nuquay as Director General of the Liberia Civil Aviation Authority. In 2020, Nuquay resigned from the Unity Party, rejoining the PUP. He also resigned as Director General of the Liberia Civil Aviation Authority. The same year, Nuquay ran for the Liberian Senate under the PUP banner, winning the Margibi seat.

Notes

References

Living people
Year of birth missing (living people)
Members of the Senate of Liberia
Unity Party (Liberia) politicians
People's Unification Party politicians
Speakers of the House of Representatives of Liberia
People from Margibi County
21st-century Liberian politicians